Santa Rosa Independent School District is a public school district based in Santa Rosa, Texas. Their rivals are La Feria. Their mascot is the Warrior and their school colors are black and gold.

In addition to Santa Rosa, the district serves the communities of Grand Acres and Tierra Bonita.

Santa Rosa ISD has three campuses: Santa Rosa High School (grades 9–12), Jo Nelson Middle School (grades 6–8), and Elma E. Barrera Elementary (prekindergarten - grade 5).

In 2009, the school district was rated "academically acceptable" by the Texas Education Agency.

The district changed to a four day school week in fall 2022.

References

External links
 

School districts in Cameron County, Texas